Silvia Benedetti is an Italian politician. She was elected to be a deputy to the Parliament of Italy in the 2013 Italian general election, and remained in parliament until March 22, 2018.

Career
Benedetti was born on October 24, 1979 in Padua. She is a biologist, with a degree in biological sciences.

She was elected to the Italian Parliament in the 2013 Italian general election, to represent the district of Veneto 1 for the Five Star Movement. She was a member of parliament until March 2018.

References

Living people
21st-century Italian women politicians
Five Star Movement politicians
1979 births
Politicians from Padua